Chris Beatrice is a video game designer and artist noted for primary creative development of popular historical strategy games, including Lords of the Realm series and the City Building series.

Beatrice worked at Sierra Entertainment's Impressions Games studio as art and creative director, director of design and development, and general manager. In 2001 he founded Tilted Mill Entertainment as President and Director of Development.

Game development roles
 Detroit (1994) – artist
 Lords of the Realm (1994) – art director
 Front Lines (1994) – art director
 Caesar II (1995) – art director
 Breach 3 (1995) – art director
 Ultimate Soccer Manager (1995) – art director
 High Seas Trader (1995) – art director
 Casino Deluxe (1995) – art director
 Robert E. Lee: Civil War General (1996) – art director
 Space Bucks (1996) – art director
 The Rise & Rule of Ancient Empires (1996) – art director
 Lords of the Realm II (1996) – creative director, designer
 Lords of the Realm II: Siege Pack (1997) – creative director, designer
 Grant, Lee, Sherman: Civil War Generals 2 (1997) – creative director
 Lords of Magic (1997) – creative director, lead designer
 Pharaoh (1999) – lead designer
 Zeus: Master of Olympus (2000) – lead designer
 Poseidon: Master of Atlantis (2001) – director
 Immortal Cities: Children of the Nile (2004) – lead designer
 Caesar IV (2006) – lead designer
 SimCity Societies (2007) – lead designer
 SimCity Societies: Destinations (2008) – designer
 Mosby's Confederacy (2008) – artist

Education
 Joseph P. Keefe Vocational high school (drawing, illustration, graphic design)
 Massachusetts College of Art (sculpture)

Book illustration
Beatrice illustrated Oscar Wilde's classic fairy tale, The Selfish Giant (Noteworthy Books, 2011).

See also
 Video game developers

External links
 Chris Beatrice web site
 3rd party interview discussing game design
 3rd party interview discussing digital art
 Chris Beatrice profile at MobyGames
 Official site of The Selfish Giant book/cd
 Tutorial by Chris Beatrice to create the illustration called "Donkeyskin"
 Chris Beatrice Making of about the illustration "Advice From a Caterpillar"
 A 6 hours elapsed tutorial about The "Gnolls" illustration by Chris Beatrice

Year of birth missing (living people)
Creative directors
American video game designers
Living people
Massachusetts College of Art and Design alumni
Video game artists